Euglossa is a genus of orchid bees (Euglossini). Like all their close relatives, they are native to the Neotropics; an introduced population exists in Florida. They are typically bright metallic blue, green, coppery, or golden.

Euglossa intersecta (formerly known as E. brullei) is morphologically and chromatically atypical for the genus, and resembles the related Eufriesea in a number of characters including coloration.

Distribution 
Euglossa occurs naturally from Mexico to Paraguay, northern Argentina, western Brazil, Jamaica, and Trinidad and Tobago, but one species (E. dilemma) has recently been introduced to Florida in the United States

Species

References

Further reading
 
 Nemésio, A., (2007): Three new species of Euglossa Latreille (Hymenoptera: Apidae) from Brazil. Zootaxa, vol. 1547, p. 21-31
 Roubik, D. W. (1989): Ecology and natural history of tropical bees. New York: Cambridge Univ. Press.
 Cameron, Sydney A.( 2004): Phylogeny and Biology of Neotropical Orchid Bees (Euglossini). Annual Review of Entomology 49: 377-404.

External links 

 David Roubik (Smithsonian Tropical Research Institute): Diagnostic photographs of several Euglossa species
 Euglossa dilemma on the UF / IFAS Featured Creatures website.

 
Articles containing video clips
Bee genera
Hymenoptera of North America
Hymenoptera of South America
Orchid pollinators